The Georgia Southern Eagles college football team competes as part of the National Collegiate Athletic Association (NCAA) Division I FBS, representing Georgia Southern University in the Sun Belt Conference. Georgia Southern has played their home games at Paulson Stadium in Statesboro, Georgia since 1984.

The inaugural season of Georgia Southern, then known as Georgia Normal School and subsequently South Georgia Teachers College and Georgia Teachers College, football was in 1924.  However, the program was shut down in 1942 because of World War II and was not revived until 1981. The Eagles are 368-177-9 all time and have claimed a record six Div. I FCS national championships.  The program has also produced two Walter Payton Award winners.

Georgia Southern was a member of the  FCS conference SoCon between 1992 and 2013.  In 2014 the program, after years of speculation, became an official member of college football's FBS level.  The Eagles now compete as a member of the Sun Belt Conference.

Seasons

References

Georgia Southern

Georgia Southern Eagles football seasons